Aabpara (formerly Bagh Bhattan) is a commercial zone located at the south west of Sector G-6, Islamabad, Pakistan, along Khayaban-e-Suharwardy. It is the oldest market of Islamabad, having been built in 1960. There is an official campsite in the Aabpara area. 

The headquarter of Pakistan's intelligence agency, ISI, is in Aabpara.

Etymology
In the newly raised capital city, this area was designated for government/civil servants and they lived here with their families. Many of them were from what was known as East Pakistan (now Bangladesh). In 1960, a baby girl was born to a Bengali lady and they named her ‘Aabpara’. Since she was the first child to be born here, all the residents celebrated the event and decided to name the locality after her.

References 

Commercial centres in Islamabad